A swimming pool is an artificially enclosed body of water that can be used for swimming.

Swimming pool may also refer to:

Film and television
Swimming Pool (1976 film), an Indian Malayalam-language film
Swimming Pool (2001 film), a German slasher film with James McAvoy, known in Germany as Der Tod feiert mit
Swimming Pool (2003 film), a film directed by Francois Ozon, with Charlotte Rampling and Ludivine Sagnier
The Swimming Pool, also known as La Piscine, a 1969 French–Italian film with Alain Delon and Romy Schneider
The Swimming Pool (1977 film), a Bulgarian film
The Swimming Pool (2012 film), a Cuban film
"The Swimming Pool", an episode of The Flintstones – see List of The Flintstones episodes#Season 1 (1960–1961)

Music
Swimming Pool (album), 1998 and last album by Al Jones
"Swimming Pool", the original title of "I'll Hold My Breath" by Ellie Goulding from her debut album Lights (2010)
"Swimming Pool", a 2019 song by Red Velvet from their Japanese EP Sappy
"Swimming Pools" (Drank), a 2012 song by rapper Kendrick Lamar
"Swimming Pools", a song by Troye Sivan from the deluxe edition of the 2015 album Blue Neighbourhood

Other uses
Olympic-size swimming pool
Lido (swimming pool), outdoor swimming pool
Swimming Pool, a marina-front portion of the Circuit de Monaco of the Monaco Grand Prix, in Monte-Carlo, Monaco

See also

Public Swimming Pools in Hong Kong
La Piscine (disambiguation)
:Category:Swimming venues